Wira Challwa (Quechua wira fat, challwa fish, "fat fish", Hispanicized spelling Huirachaygua) is a  mountain in the Andes of Peru and the name of a small  lake near of the mountain. It is located in the Junín Region, Huancayo Province, Chongos Alto District. Wira Challwa lies west of Waqra Willka.

References

Mountains of Junín Region
Mountains of Peru
Lakes of Junín Region
Lakes of Peru